Mistresses is a British serial drama television programme that follows the lives of four female friends and their involvement in an array of illicit and complex relationships. The programme was written by Rachel Pole, Richard Warlow, Harriet Braun and Catrin Clarke and filmed in Bristol by Ecosse Films for BBC Drama, Wales.

The first series was broadcast on BBC One from 8 January to 12 February 2008 in a six-episode run. A second series of six episodes aired from 17 February to 24 March 2009. Mistresses returned for a third and final series comprising four episodes on 5 August 2010.

Main characters
Katie Roden (Sarah Parish) is a GP who, at the beginning of series one, is having an affair with John Grey, a terminally ill patient whom she later helps commit physician assisted suicide. After John's death, his son, Sam (Max Brown), discovers evidence of this. Distraught, he confides in Katie, unaware of her role in his father's life and they begin a reluctant relationship as she struggles with her grief and guilt over helping John die. Ultimately, unable to lie any longer, Katie tells Sam, who informs his mother and the authorities resulting in Katie being suspended from work for a year.

Series two begins with Katie taking a junior post in a hospital department working alongside an old lover from medical school, Jack Hudson (Steven Brand), now married to Megan (Natasha Little) but still holds a torch for Katie. Katie also meets Jack and Megan's friend, fellow surgeon Dan Tate (Mark Umbers), with whom she strikes up a relationship. All goes well until Jack decides to act on his feelings for Katie and they embark on a brief affair. Katie ends the affair before she is discovered but Dan witnesses a final kiss between the pair and decides to move to Australia to take up a medical post he's been offered. Katie leaves a heartfelt note of apology for Dan, which he reads before asking her to go with him to Australia.

Series three introduces Katie's mother Vivienne Roden (Joanna Lumley), with whom Katie has a tense relationship. Vivienne has found a new man and intends on selling the old family home where Katie lived as a child, much to Katie's distaste. Later, Katie discovers that her (now-deceased) father had a mistress during his marriage to Vivienne, and Katie softens toward her mother. Also this series, Katie becomes close with Trudi's partner, Richard, (Patrick Baladi) and the two lean on each other during hard times as well as sharing a kiss. After rejecting a relationship with Richard, but agreeing to counsel him on his marriage, Richard is killed in a car accident on his way to meet Katie at the train station. Trudi later discovers the plan and, feeling betrayed (thinking the two were having an affair and that Richard intended to leave her for Katie), ends her friendship with Katie.

Trudi Malloy (Sharon Small) is a 9/11 widow and mother of two, who is convinced her husband, Paul, is still alive. In the first episode, she receives a cheque from a 9/11 bereavement fund worth around £1 million and begins seeing Richard (Patrick Baladi), a single father whose daughter goes to the same school as Trudi's daughters. A woman, Sally, makes contact with Trudi, claiming she was Paul's lover while he was in New York City and that they have a son together. Trudi decides to split the money with Sally in order to provide for the son Paul fathered with her, but is stunned to discover that she was right all along - Paul is alive, and used 9/11 as an excuse to carry out his plan of leaving Trudi for Sally. Trudi informs the authorities and returns the bereavement money.

In series two, Richard and his daughter, Amy, have moved in with Trudi and her daughters and put his house on the market. Trudi wants them to divorce their partners and get married but Richard is unsure. Trudi also starts selling her home-made cakes at a local deli where Lucas (Sean Francis), the owner, is clearly keen on her. Concerns over Richard's finances lead Trudi to discover his secret - that his wife, who he had claimed had abandoned him and Amy, is in a residential home for patients suffering early-onset Alzheimer's. Horrified, Trudi insists that Richard tells Amy the truth about her mother. Despite her brief fling with Lucas, she and Richard reconcile eventually, settling down to life together as a family.

In series three, Richard is feeling sidelined as Trudi spends all of her time at her cake business, which now has its own factory and workforce. Whilst he embarks on a friendship and brief affair with Katie, Trudi is flattered by the attentions of an investor in the cake business, Chris (Vincent Regan), and frustrated by what she feels is a lack of support from Richard. She enjoys a one-night stand with Chris but soon comes to regret it and is distraught when Richard is killed in a car accident whilst on his way to meet Katie at the train station, where he intends to talk about Trudi's infidelity.

Jessica Fraser (Shelley Conn) is an event planner who has had a string of lovers including her boss, Simon (Adam Astill), and who doesn't get involved in committed, long-term relationships. In the first episode, she is organizing a wedding for a lesbian couple and strikes up a friendship with one of the brides, Alex (Anna Torv). There's clear chemistry between the pair and Jessica realises that she has feelings for Alex, which later become complicated when she begins to fall in love with her. After seeing the trouble caused by her friend Siobhan's infidelity, Jessica breaks off the relationship, despite Alex's offer to leave her partner for Jessica.

As series two begins, Jessica is in an open marriage with a man named Mark with whom she had a whirlwind affair. Jessica believes the marriage is a strong one but is shocked by how jealous she is when she realizes that Mark has been engaged in a long term sexual relationship with his assistant, Carrie, (Preeya Kalidas). Jessica makes her feelings known, and though Mark realises she is unhappy he can't bring himself to be faithful to one woman, causing them to split. Jess discovers that she is pregnant and, to her surprise, can't bring herself to have a termination. Mark tells her they should make a go of things as a family and cease seeing other people.

At the start of series 3 two years later, Jessica has miscarried and Mark has gone bankrupt. He is forced to accept a lowly job in a call centre to provide for his family, but the shame of how far he has fallen causes him to quit and Jessica realises they can't afford IVF treatment so Mark accepts a loan from Siobhan, claiming it is for the IVF but actually using it to invest in business, in a bid to regain his lost wealth. When Jessica finds out, she's furious, causing her friendship with Siobhan and relationship with Mark to unravel.

Siobhan Dillon (Orla Brady) is a successful lawyer. She and her husband, Hari (Raza Jaffrey), have been trying to start a family for some time and Siobhan is weary of his obsession with their fertility issues. She flirts with and eventually has a brief affair with a colleague, Dominic (Adam Rayner). Upon seeing a specialist, Hari discovers that he is infertile, but the doctor suggests IVF treatment. Before this can take place, Siobhan is shocked to discover she is pregnant and realises the baby must be Dominic's. Initially, she lets Hari think that he is the father but eventually admits the affair. Hari is heartbroken but nonetheless (after a brief split) agrees to take Siobhan back and raise the child as their own.

As series two begins, Siobhan has had the baby - a little girl, Elsa - and returned to work. Hari has become a stay-at-home dad but has not been able to forgive Siobhan for her infidelity and they are sleeping in separate beds. To satisfy her sexual needs, Siobhan secretly goes out during the night and picks up men in hotel bars for anonymous sex. When Jessica discovers what Siobhan is doing, Siobhan tries to argue that this is different, and more acceptable, than her relationship with Dominic because she is not emotionally involved. Things become complicated when she meets Tom McCormack (Thomas Lockyer), an older businessman who is unsatisfied with their one night stand and begins to pursue Siobhan, showing up at her home and becoming a client at work in a bid to insert himself into her life. Eventually Tom resorts to sending photos of him and Siobhan together to Hari, destroying her marriage. Hari bids an emotional goodbye to Siobhan and baby Elsa, then leaves for good.

Siobhan's romances take a back seat in series three as she continues bringing up Elsa as a single mother. When Dominic, with whom Siobhan has remained friends, tells her that he is engaged to a woman he met whilst working in America, Siobhan is initially pleased but clearly still harbours feelings for the father of her child. The two grow closer again but Siobhan is determined not to act on her feelings and ruin the wedding plans. Eventually Dominic tells Siobhan it's her that he wants and that he's called off the wedding, and the pair reconcile.

Episodes

Series overview

Series 1 (2008)

Series 2 (2009)

Series 3 (2010)

Filming locations
Locations used for filming other than Bristol: The wedding sequences in episode 1 of series 2 were shot in the gardens and cloister of Iford Manor, near Bradford-on-Avon, Wiltshire. Siobhan's flings in series 2 are filmed in a suite at the Bath Spa Hotel.

Viewing figures

Home releases
The first series was released on DVD in the United Kingdom and Ireland on 4 February 2008. The second series was released on 30 March 2009.

International broadcasts
In Australia it was broadcast on the Seven Network from 29 April 2008, New Zealand on TV One from 5 November 2008, USA on BBC America from 20 February 2009, and Ireland on RTÉ One from 23 June 2009.

Remakes

U.S. remakes
Lifetime produced a pilot in 2009 which was never picked up to series. Coincidentally, Alyssa Milano's Charmed co-star Holly Marie Combs was to star and produce it. Rochelle Aytes was also featured in this version, as well as in the ABC series, which ran for 4 seasons.

American Broadcasting Company (a 50% owner of Lifetime) commissioned another Mistresses version, which began in 2012, starring Yunjin Kim in the role of Karen (based on Katie from the UK series), Rochelle Aytes as April (based on Trudi from the UK series), Jes Macallan as Josslyn (based on Jessica from the UK series), and Alyssa Milano as Savannah (based on Siobhan from the UK series).

South Korean remake
Studio Dragon and Chorokbaem Media announced a South Korean remake of the series, Mistress, set to air in April 2018.

Japanese remake
NHK has bought the remake rights to Mistresses from BBC. It is the first sale by BBC to the Japanese broadcaster.

The 10-episode series is set to air from April 2019 in Drama 10 of NHK General TV.

Turkish remake
Fox has bought the remake rights to Mistresses from BBC Studios. It is the first sale by BBC to the Turkish broadcaster.

References

External links
 
 taken from 18 May 2007, during filming of Mistresses.

Mistresses en Lesbicanarias Resúmenes de Episodio (Spanish)
OrlandoSentinel
Mistresses photos RadioTimes.com

 UK
2000s British drama television series
2008 British television series debuts
2010s British drama television series
2010 British television series endings
BBC television dramas
British drama television series
2000s British LGBT-related drama television series
2010s British LGBT-related drama television series